Jussen or Jüssen is a surname. Notable people with the surname include: 

Edmund Jüssen (1830–1891), German-American politician and diplomat
Lucas & Arthur Jussen (born 1993 and 1996), Dutch piano duo